County Clare was a constituency representing County Clare in the Irish House of Commons, the lower house in the Irish Parliament of the Kingdom of Ireland. It returned two members to the Parliament of Ireland from 1613 to 1800.

In the Patriot Parliament of 1689 summoned by James II, Clare was represented with two members.

Following the Acts of Union 1800, it was succeeded by the County Clare constituency in the United Kingdom House of Commons.

Members of Parliament
 1585 Sir Turlogh O'Brien, Ennistymon and Boetius Clancy, Knockfinn.
 1613–1615 Sir Daniel O'Brien, later Viscount Clare and Boetius Clancy, Knockfinn.
 1634–1635 Sir Barnaby O’Brien (later 6th Earl of Thomond) (replaced by Sir Daniel O'Brien) and Boetius Clancy, Knockfinn
 1639 Dermot O’Brien of Dromore and Donogh O’Brien of Dough.
 1654 Sir Hardress Waller;Henry Ingoldsby (First Protectorate Parliament, Westminster)
 1654 Sir Hardress Waller;Henry Ingoldsby (Second Protectorate Parliament, Westminster)
 1659 Sir Hardress Waller;Henry Ingoldsby (Third Protectorate Parliament, Westminster)
 1661–1666 Henry O'Brien, Lord Ibrackan and Sir Henry Ingoldsby, 1st Baronet of Beggstown Castle, Co. Meath.

1689–1801

Notes

References

Bibliography

Constituencies of the Parliament of Ireland (pre-1801)
Historic constituencies in County Clare
1800 disestablishments in Ireland
Constituencies disestablished in 1800